Kathleen Veronica Belsten (born 22 February 1993), better known by her online aliases Loserfruit and Lufu, is an Australian Twitch live streamer, YouTuber, professional gamer, and internet personality. She has the second-most followed channel on Twitch among female gamers, behind Pokimane. She posts Let's Play gaming videos on her main YouTube channel Loserfruit, vlogs on her second channel Lufu, and additional gaming videos on her third channel Loserfruit Daily. Her main YouTube channel has 3.31 million subscribers while her vlog channel Lufu has over 800 thousand subscribers. 

Belsten specializes in the Fortnite: Battle Royale game and its variants, and was the second streamer to receive their own Fortnite outfit as part of the Fortnite Icon Series, after Ninja. She was one of the leading streamers to compete in the inaugural Fortnite Summer Smash tournament to be hosted at the Australian Open in 2019, and attended the second edition in 2020 as well. Belsten is sponsored by the elf cosmetics brand and the Gymshark fitness apparel brand.

Belsten started her YouTube and Twitch channels by streaming League of Legends. She then moved to Overwatch before moving to more Fortnite-based content in the end of 2017.  

Belsten was a member of Click, a since-disbanded group of Australian YouTubers who collaborated on videos that also included LazarBeam, Muselk, Crayator, Bazza Gazza, Tannar, Mully, Fresh and her boyfriend Prestige Clips (also known as Marcus). She led a 36 hour-long charity stream in January 2020 with Crayator and Fasffy that raised just over A$318,000 for the Australian bushfire relief effort, in which many other members and friends of Click also participated.

Career

YouTube 
Belsten started her YouTube channel "Loserfruit" on 25 March 2013 and initially started posting League of Legends videos. During the start of her YouTube career, she started making satirical videos on League of Legends, often with a comedic aspect. She hit 100,000 subscribers on her main channel in May of 2017 and has since reached 3.38 million subscribers (as of December 2022). She currently has 461,816,378 views on her main YouTube channel. 

Belsten started her second YouTube channel known as "Lufu" on 24 September 2016 where she mainly made vlogs of her day-to-day life, often in a humorous manner. She has reached 767,000 subscribers on her vlog channel and has amassed 86,673,874 views on there.

References

Australian YouTubers
Gaming YouTubers
1993 births
Twitch (service) streamers
Vlogs-related YouTube channels
Video game commentators
Living people
YouTube vloggers
YouTube channels launched in 2013